Bethany Chapel (Hamburg Presbyterian Church) is a historic chapel at 103 Hamburg Turnpike in Hamburg, Sussex County, New Jersey, United States.

It was built in 1869 and added to the National Register in 1980.

See also
National Register of Historic Places listings in Sussex County, New Jersey

References

Presbyterian churches in New Jersey
Churches on the National Register of Historic Places in New Jersey
Gothic Revival church buildings in New Jersey
Churches completed in 1869
19th-century Presbyterian church buildings in the United States
Churches in Sussex County, New Jersey
National Register of Historic Places in Sussex County, New Jersey
Hamburg, New Jersey
1869 establishments in New Jersey
New Jersey Register of Historic Places